Valoga Glacier is the glacier extending 8 km in southwest-northeast direction and 4 km in southeast-northwest direction in Flowers Hills on the east side of Sentinel Range in Ellsworth Mountains, Antarctica.  It flows northwestwards into Hansen Glacier.

The feature is named after Valoga Cave in northwestern Bulgaria.

Location
US mapping in 1988.

See also
 List of glaciers in the Antarctic
 Glaciology

Maps
 Vinson Massif.  Scale 1:250 000 topographic map.  Reston, Virginia: US Geological Survey, 1988.
 Antarctic Digital Database (ADD). Scale 1:250000 topographic map of Antarctica. Scientific Committee on Antarctic Research (SCAR). Since 1993, regularly updated.

References
 Valoga Glacier. SCAR Composite Antarctic Gazetteer.
 Bulgarian Antarctic Gazetteer. Antarctic Place-names Commission. (details in Bulgarian, basic data in English)

External links
 Valoga Glacier. Copernix satellite image

Glaciers of Ellsworth Land
Bulgaria and the Antarctic